Opfergang (The Great Sacrifice or Rite of Sacrifice) is a 1944 German film directed by Veit Harlan.  It is based on Rudolf G. Binding's work of the same title, with alterations for propaganda purposes.

Synopsis
Albrecht Froben, though married to Octavia, falls in love with his neighbor, Äls Flodéen.  She, however, is slowly dying from a debilitating disease.  During an epidemic, Albrecht goes to bring her daughter to safety but he catches typhoid and is quarantined in hospital. Octavia, realising the love match, and hearing that Äls is now bedridden and dying, dresses up as him and rides by her gates every day to keep her spirits up—her bed is next to the window.  Albrecht returns.  Äls has a dream in which she talks to her projection of Albrecht and concludes that she does not wish to take part in this union and accepts death.  Albrecht is reconciled with his wife.

Cast
 Kristina Söderbaum as Äls Flodéen
 Irene von Meyendorff as Octavia Froben
 Carl Raddatz as Albrecht Froben
 Franz Schafheitlin as Mathias
 Ernst Stahl-Nachbaur as Sanitätsrat Dr. Terboven
 Otto Treßler as Senator Froben, Octavia's father
 Annemarie Steinsieck as Frau Froben, Octavia's mother
 Frida Richard as Frau Steinkamp, who cares for Äls'a child
 Ludwig Schmitz as carnival speaker
 Edgar Pauly as the servant of the Frobens
 Charlotte Schultz as Äls's nurse
 Paul Bildt as the notary for testament

Motifs
Nazism makes no overt appearance in the film, which appears a work of entertainment, but it includes themes frequently found in Nazi propaganda. Sacrifice and death are constant motifs in the movie — Äls even recounts how she had to put down her ill dog — and Albrecht's return to his wife is a reflection of a realization of the tragic side of life.

Although Äls is a danger to the marriage, she is not presented as wholly negative, owing to her love of nature.  She dies in a reversal of the source material, where the husband dies.  This reflected a need to avoid temptation to adultery, when many families were separated, and Joseph Goebbels himself insisted that it must be the woman rather than the man who paid.  Nevertheless, her death is surrounded by a heavenly chorus and transcendence.

Distribution
Owing to the shortage of raw film, and its full color spectacular nature, it received only very limited release.

Reception 
The Slovenian philosopher Slavoj Žižek, interested in ideologies in cinema, voted for Opfergang in the 2012 Sight & Sound poll of the best films of all time. He called the film "the masterpiece" of Harlan and wrote: "The ultimate lesson of this intricate staging is that the bitter truth (marriage will survive, Äls has to accept her death) can only be formulated in the guise of a hallucination within a hallucination. And, perhaps, here enters the fact that Veit Harlan was the Nazi director, author of the two key propaganda classics, The Jew Suess and Kolberg: does the same formal feature not hold also for the Nazi ideology? In it, the truth can appear only as the hallucination within the hallucination, as the way the Nazi subject hallucinates the Jews hallucinating their anti-German plot."

References

External links

Opfergang at Virtual History

1944 films
1944 romantic drama films
Films of Nazi Germany
1940s German-language films
Films directed by Veit Harlan
Films set in Hamburg
German black-and-white films
German romantic drama films